Other Roads is the tenth studio album by Boz Scaggs released in 1988. After an eight-year hiatus from recording, Scaggs returned in 1988 with this album,  a record aimed primarily at the adult contemporary market. 

The album reached #47 on the Billboard Top Pop album chart, while the lead single “Heart of Mine” was a big Adult Contemporary success, peaking at #3 on that chart. The single also reached #35 on the Billboard pop singles chart, making it his last hit on that chart to date. This single was produced by Stewart Levine (who also produced Joe Cocker and Jennifer Warnes' "Up Where We Belong" and Simply Red's two #1 hits, "Holding Back the Years" and "If You Don't Know Me by Now").  Another adult contemporary radio hit from the album, "Cool Running" was co-written by producer Patrick Leonard.

Overview
Artists such as Pamela Hutchinson of The Emotions, James Ingram, Phil Perry, David Paich, Jeff Porcaro and Steve Lukather of Toto, Siedah Garrett and Marcus Miller appeared on the album.

Critical reception

In their retrospective review, AllMusic praised both Scaggs's vocal performance and the unusual stylistic mix and tones of the songs. They concluded, "Scaggs tried hard to walk a line between the decade's obsession with more processed studio sounds that utilized electronic keyboards and drum machines up front, while relying more heavily on electric guitars and kit drums. He doesn't always succeed in keeping the balance, but the attempt sets him apart from most mainstream acts at that time."

Track listing
 "What's Number One?" (Boz Scaggs, J. C. Carroll, Marcus Miller) – 3:58
 "Claudia" (Scaggs, Larry Williams) – 4:07
 "Heart of Mine" (Scaggs, Bobby Caldwell, Dennis Matkosky, Jason Scheff) – 4:12
 "Right Out of My Head" (Scaggs, D. Tyler Huff) – 5:24
 "I Don't Hear You" (J.C. Carroll, D. Tyler Huff) – 4:41
 "Mental Shakedown" (Scaggs, Guy Allison Steiner, David Williams) – 4:10
 "Soul to Soul" (CD bonus track) - 5:02
 "Crimes of Passion" (J.C. Carroll, D. Tyler Huff) – 4:00
 "Funny" (Scaggs, Marcus Miller) – 5:49
 "Cool Running" (Scaggs, Patrick Leonard, David Williams) – 4:14
 "The Night of Van Gogh" (Scaggs, Bobby Caldwell, Peter Wolf) – 4:20

Personnel 
 Boz Scaggs – lead vocals, backing vocals (4)
 Rhett Lawrence – keyboards (1), drums (1), programming (5), keyboard programming (8)
 Peter Wolf – keyboards (1)
 Marcus Miller – keyboard programming (1), bass (1, 7-10), rhythm arrangements (1), synthesizer drums (8), percussion (8), clarinet (8)
 Larry Williams – keyboards (2), rhythm arrangements (2), saxophones (9), horn arrangements (9)
 Aaron Zigman – keyboards/synthesizers such as a Yamaha DX7 and some synthesizer (3), rhythm arrangements (3), synth horns (6)
 Robbie Buchanan – keyboards (4, 5, 7, 10), rhythm arrangements (10)
 Alan Pasqua – additional keyboards (4, 5)
 Guy Allison Steiner – keyboards (6), bass (6), synthesizer drums (6), percussion (6)
 Patrick Leonard – keyboards (9), rhythm arrangements (9)
 David Paich – acoustic piano (10), synth strings (10), rhythm and string arrangements (10)
 Dann Huff – guitar (1, 5, 10), guitar solo (1, 4), rhythm arrangements (4, 5, 7), lead guitar (7)
 Michael Landau – guitar (1), guitar solo (8)
 Buzz Feiten – guitar solo (2)
 Paul Jackson Jr. – guitar (3)
  Carlos Rios – guitar (3)
 Steve Lukather – guitar (4), lead guitar (6)
 David Williams – guitar (6, 9), rhythm arrangements (6)
 Freddie Washington – bass (2, 3)
 David Hungate – bass (4)
 Jeff Porcaro – drums (1, 4, 5, 7, 9, 10)
 John Robinson – drums (2, 3, 6)
 Lenny Castro – percussion (1, 4, 9)
 Paulinho da Costa – additional percussion (6, 9)
 Brandon Fields – saxophones (9), horn arrangements (9) 
 Gary Grant – trumpet (9), horn arrangements (9)
 Jerry Hey – trumpet (9), horn arrangements (9)
 Marty Paich – string arrangements (10)
 Charlotte Crossley – backing vocals (1, 5)
 David Lasley – backing vocals (1, 5)
 Paulette McWilliams – backing vocals (1, 5)
 Myrna Smith Schilling – backing vocals (1, 5)
 James Ingram – backing vocals (3)
 Phillip Ingram – backing vocals (3, 9)
 Phil Perry – backing vocals (3, 9)
 Siedah Garrett – backing vocals (4, 7, 10)
 Timothy B. Schmit – backing vocals (4)
 Kevin Dorsey – backing vocals (4, 5)
 Carl Carwell – backing vocals (6)
 Jeanette Hanes – backing vocals (6)
 Pam Hutchinson – backing vocals (6)
 Darryl Phinnessee – backing vocals (9)
 Kate Markowitz – backing vocals (10)
 Edie Lehmann – backing vocals (10)

Production
 Producers – Bill Schnee (Tracks 1, 4, 5 & 7-10); Stewart Levine (Tracks 2 & 3); Boz Scaggs and David Williams (Track 6).
 Engineers – Bill Schnee (Tracks 1, 4, 5 & 7-10); Darren Klein (Tracks 2 & 3); Dan Garcia and Shep Longsdale (Track 6).
 Assistant Engineers – Dan Garcia  (Tracks 1 & 4-10); Julie Last (Tracks 2 & 3).
 Recorded at Bill Schnee Studios and Ocean Way Recording (Hollywood, CA).
 Mixing – Steve Thompson and Michael Barbiero  (Tracks 1, 4, 5 & 7); Daren Klein (Tracks 2 & 3); Mick Guzauski (Track 6); Bill Schnee (Tracks 8, 9 & 10).
 Mixed at Bill Schnee Studios, Ocean Way Recording, Bearsville Studios (Bearsville, NY) and Mediasound (New York City, NY).
 Mastered by Doug Sax at The Mastering Lab (Hollywood, CA).
 Production Assistant – Deborah Klein 
 Design – John Casado
 Photography – Annie Leibovitz
 Management – The Front Line Management Company, Inc.

Charts

References 

1988 albums
Boz Scaggs albums
Albums produced by Stewart Levine
Columbia Records albums
Albums produced by Bill Schnee
Albums produced by Boz Scaggs